Philippe Louis Joseph Ignace van de Werve, 1st Baron of Schilde (1784 – 1834) formed part of a very old, important and noble family of Antwerp.

Family 
He is one of the 12 children of Charles III Philippe van de Werve, 1st Count of Vorsselaer and Marie-Anne de Pret.
He married 3 times:
 Marie-Alexandrine de Fraule, daughter of Thomas, viscount of Fraula; and of Anne-Louise van Colen.
 Thérèse Peeters, daughter of Jean, Lord of Aertselar, Lord of Cleydael and Lord of Buerstede; and of Françoise van den Cruyce. The family Peeters was colossalement rich.
 Marie-Louise della Faille, daughter of Jacque-Abilius della Faille and of Claire della Faille.

He had 2 children with Marie-Louise della Faille:
 Jacques van de Werve, 2nd Baron of Schilde (1793-1845). He married Charlotte de Cossé-Brissac.
 Marie-Josephe van de Werve (1795-1811)

Career 
In 1768 he became by imperial decree 1st Baron of Schilde. Van de Werve was a freemason and member of La Concorde Universelle Lodge in Antwerp.

References 

1748 births
1834 deaths
Philippe-Louis
Philippe-Louis